Guocun ("Guo Village") may refer to either of two unrelated Chinese towns:

 Guocun, Shanxi (Guōcūn Zhèn), in Qin County
 Guocun, Hebei (Guōcūn Zhèn), in Xuanhua County
 Dongguocun Township (Dōngguōcūn Xiāng) in Hebei appears to mean "East Guocun", but in fact Dongguo (lit. "Eastern Wall") is an uncommon surname.